The 1962 New Zealand Grand Prix was a motor race held at the Ardmore Circuit on 6 January 1962.

Classification

References

New Zealand Grand Prix
Grand Prix
January 1962 sports events in New Zealand